WLQK (95.9 FM, "Lite Rock 95.9") is a radio station broadcasting an adult contemporary music format. Licensed to Livingston, Tennessee, United States, the station serves the Cookeville area. The station is currently owned by Stonecom.

References

External links

LQK
Mainstream adult contemporary radio stations in the United States
Overton County, Tennessee